The speckled spiny tree-rat (Pattonomys semivillosus) is a species of rodent in the family Echimyidae. It is found in northern Colombia and Venezuela. It can be found in gallery forest and dry forest. Its diet includes fruit and seeds.

References

Pattonomys
Mammals of Colombia
Mammals of Venezuela
Mammals described in 1838
Taxonomy articles created by Polbot